Unity Township is a township in Piatt County, Illinois, USA.  As of the 2010 census, its population was 1,418 and it contained 666 housing units.

Geography

Cities and towns
 Atwood (west half)
 Hammond

Extinct towns
 Mackville
 Pierson
 Voorhies

Adjacent townships
 Bement Township (north)
 Sadorus Township, Champaign County (northeast)
 Garrett Township, Douglas County (east)
 Lowe Township, Moultrie County (south)
 Lovington Township, Moultrie County (southwest)
 Cerro Gordo Township (west)

Cemeteries
The township contains six cemeteries: Antioch, Hammond, Lake Fork, Long, Mackville and Moore.

Major highways
  U.S. Route 36

Airports and landing strips
 Morris Farm Incorporated Airport

Demographics

References
 U.S. Board on Geographic Names (GNIS)
 United States Census Bureau cartographic boundary files

External links
 US-Counties.com
 City-Data.com
 Illinois State Archives

Townships in Piatt County, Illinois
Townships in Illinois